Carenum cordipenne is a species of ground beetle in the subfamily Scaritinae, found in Australia. It was described by Sloane in 1897.

References

cordipenne
Beetles described in 1897